The 14th Alabama Infantry Regiment was an infantry regiment that served in the Confederate Army during the American Civil War.

Service
The 14th Alabama Infantry Regiment was mustered in at Richmond, Virginia, on August 1, 1861.

During one of the first battles that the 14th fought in, at Glendale, the unit was sent in as a vanguard against Union positions and suffered considerable casualties. 

The regiment surrendered  at Appomattox Court House.

Total strength and casualties
The 14th mustered 1,317 men during its existence.  It suffered approximately 250 killed in action or mortally wounded and 350 men who died of disease, for a total of approximately 600 fatalities.  An additional 159 men were discharged or transferred from the regiment.

Commanders
 Colonel Thomas James Judge
 Colonel Alfred Campbell Wood
 Colonel Lucius Pinkard

See also
Alabama Civil War Confederate Units
Alabama in the American Civil War

Notes

References

Units and formations of the Confederate States Army from Alabama
1861 establishments in Alabama
Military units and formations established in 1861